Azerbaijan competed at the 2004 Summer Olympics in Athens, Greece from 13 to 29 August 2004. 36 competitors, 30 men and 6 women, took part in 36 events in 10 sports.

Medalists

Athletics 

Azerbaijani athletes have so far achieved qualifying standards in the following athletics events (up to a maximum of 3 athletes in each event at the 'A' Standard, and 1 at the 'B' Standard).

Key
 Note–Ranks given for track events are within the athlete's heat only
 Q = Qualified for the next round
 q = Qualified for the next round as a fastest loser or, in field events, by position without achieving the qualifying target
 NR = National record
 N/A = Round not applicable for the event
 Bye = Athlete not required to compete in round

Men
Track & road events

Field events

Women
Field events

Boxing 

Azerbaijan sent 9 boxers to the Olympics.  They won 2 bronze medals, with 3 other boxers falling in the quarterfinals.  The combined record of the Azeri boxers was 15-9, with each boxer winning at least one match.  Azerbaijan was in a four-way tie for 12th place in the boxing medals scoreboard.

Fencing

Women

Gymnastics

Rhythmic
Dinara Gimatova who qualified for the 2004 Olympics could not compete due to a practice injury. She was replaced by Anna Gurbanova.

Judo

Men

Shooting 

Women

Swimming 

Men

Women

Taekwondo

Weightlifting

Wrestling 

Key
  - Victory by Fall.
  - Decision by Points - the loser with technical points.
  - Decision by Points - the loser without technical points.

Men's freestyle

Men's Greco-Roman

See also
Azerbaijan at the 2004 Summer Paralympics

References

External links
Official Report of the XXVIII Olympiad
NOC Azerbaijan 

Nations at the 2004 Summer Olympics
2004
Olympics